A bycocket or bycoket is a style of hat that was fashionable for both men and women in Western Europe from the 13th to the 16th century. It has a wide brim that is turned up in the back and pointed in the front like a bird's beak. In French, it is called a chapeau à bec due to this resemblance.

The hat was originally worn by nobles and royalty, and later by the rising merchant class. It was often decorated with feathers, jewels, or other ornaments. Today, it is commonly associated with the character Robin Hood.

References

Hats
Caps
Robin Hood
13th-century fashion
14th-century fashion
15th-century fashion
16th-century fashion
History of clothing (Western fashion)
Medieval European costume